Behrouz Makvandi (born 23 August 1963) is an Iranian retired football player and manager.

Honours 
Naft Masjed Soleyman
Azadegan League (1): 2013–14 (Runner-up)

References

Living people
1963 births
Iranian footballers
Iranian football managers
Association football defenders
People from Masjed Soleyman
Sportspeople from Khuzestan province